In 1980, the NBC Parent Participation TV Workshop held the first National Student/Parent Mock Election. Through its success, the National Student/Parent Mock Election became a separate nonprofit, nonpartisan organization in 1982. The 1982 Mock Election had over 250,000 participants. This grew to 3.5 million participants in 1988, and as many as 5 million in 1992. In 1996 and 1998, the National Student/Parent Mock Election was also conducted on Votelink.com Results from Secretary of State offices were linked to an interactive map of all 50 states on Votelink.com

References
Votelink.com 
National Mock Election
ed.gov
School Renewal
PR WEB

Student organizations in the United States